Oncagnostus is a genus of trilobite in the order Agnostida, which existed in what is now Shandong, China. It was described by Whitehouse in 1936, and the type species is Oncagnostus hoi, which was originally described as a species of Agnostus by Sun in 1924.

References

Agnostidae
Trilobites of Asia
Paleozoic life of Yukon